Joseph Parkinson Newsham (May 24, 1837 – October 22, 1919) was a 19th-century politician, lawyer, merchant and planter from Louisiana, who served two non-consecutive terms in the U.S. House of Representatives.

Biography
Born in Preston, England, Newsham immigrated to the United States with his parents in 1839, settling in Monroe County, Illinois. He received an academic education, was employed in a mercantile establishment for two years, studied law, and was admitted to the bar in 1860, commencing practice in Edwardsville, Illinois. During the Civil War, he served as adjutant of the 32nd Missouri Volunteer Infantry in the Union Army, resigning in 1864 on account of disabling injuries received in action on July 4 of that year.

Newsham moved to Donaldsonville, Louisiana, in 1864 where he was clerk of the fourth judicial district court of the Parish of Ascension and was admitted to the Louisiana bar in 1865, commencing practice in Donaldsonville. He moved to St. Francisville, Louisiana, in 1867 and was a member of the Louisiana Constitutional Convention in 1867 and 1868. Upon Louisiana's being admitted back into the Union, Newsham was elected a Republican to the U.S. House of Representatives in 1868 from Louisiana's 3rd congressional district and served until 1869. He established the Feliciana Republican in 1868 and was elected to the House of Representatives in 1870, this time from Louisiana's 4th congressional district,  and served for that district until 1871. He was not a candidate for renomination in 1870 and thus left office when the term ended in 1871.

Afterward, he worked as a planter and merchant in St. Francisville, Louisiana until his retirement in 1913.

Death
Newsham died in St. Francisville on October 22, 1919, and was interred in Grace Church Cemetery in St. Francisville.

Notes

1837 births
1919 deaths
American newspaper people
Illinois lawyers
Louisiana lawyers
People from Edwardsville, Illinois
English emigrants to the United States
People of Missouri in the American Civil War
Union Army officers
American planters
Republican Party members of the United States House of Representatives from Louisiana
19th-century American politicians
Journalists from Illinois
People from Donaldsonville, Louisiana
People from St. Francisville, Louisiana
19th-century American lawyers
Military personnel from Illinois